Qarajeh-ye Feyzollah (also Romanized as Qarājeh-ye Feyẕollāh, Qarajeh Feyzollāh, and Qarājeh-ye Feyẕollāh; also known as Farājeh-ye Bālā, Gharajeh Fizelah, Nizhnyaya Karadzha, Qarājeh Bālā, Qarājeh Faẕlollāh, Qarājeh-ye Fazlollāh, and Qarājeh-ye Faẕlollāh) is a village in Koshksaray Rural District, in the Central District of Marand County, East Azerbaijan Province, Iran. At the 2006 census, its population was 1,851, in 449 families.

References 

Populated places in Marand County